John Phillips (November 26, 1770 – May 29, 1823) was an American politician, serving as the first mayor of Boston, Massachusetts, from 1822 to 1823.  He was the father of abolitionist Wendell Phillips.

Life and politics
Phillips was a descendant of the Rev. George Phillips of Watertown, the progenitor of the New England Phillips family in America.  He graduated from Phillips Academy and then went on to Harvard College, graduating in 1788.   In 1794, he was invited to deliver the annual Fourth of July oration before the people of Boston. In 1800, he was made public prosecutor, and in 1803 was chosen representative to the Massachusetts General Court. He was sent to the Massachusetts Senate in 1804, serving as presiding officer from 1813 to 1823. He was elected a Fellow of the American Academy of Arts and Sciences in 1810, and in 1812, he was chosen a member of the corporation of Harvard.  Phillips was also elected a member of the American Antiquarian Society in 1813.

In 1820, he was a member of the convention that met to consider the revision of the state constitution, and he took an active part in the proceedings of that body. Phillips was also active in the agitation for the adoption of a city government in Boston, and was chairman of the committee of twelve that drew up and reported on a city charter for the town in 1822. In the choice for mayor that followed, Harrison Gray Otis and Josiah Quincy III were the chief candidates for the office, but, as neither was able to secure an election, their friends agreed on Phillips, who was elected on 16 April 1822. At the close of his term of office the precarious condition of his health led him to decline a re-election.

Honors 
Phillips Street and the Phillips School (later Northeast Institute of Industrial Technology) in Boston's Beacon Hill neighborhood were named after John Phillips.

Gallery

See also
 Timeline of Boston, 1820s

Notes

References
 Mayors of Boston: An Illustrated Epitome of who the Mayors Have Been and What they Have Done, Boston, MA: State Street Trust Company, (1914)
 The Boston Directory Published by Published by George Adams, (1851). p. 6.

External links
 Political graveyard information on John Phillips
 

1770 births
1823 deaths
Harvard University alumni
Massachusetts lawyers
Mayors of Boston
Members of the Massachusetts House of Representatives
Presidents of the Massachusetts Senate
Massachusetts state senators
Fellows of the American Academy of Arts and Sciences
Members of the American Antiquarian Society
Phillips family (New England)